Richard Lemarchand is game designer, teacher, and author. He is known for being the lead designer on the Uncharted video game series from Naughty Dog.

Game Design
After graduating from Oxford with a degree in physics and philosophy, in 1991 Lemarchand worked as a junior game designer at the British studio of American company MicroProse.

In 1995, Lemarchand became a senior game designer at Crystal Dynamics, known for Tomb Raider. At Crystal Dynamics, he led the design for the Gex series and later the Legacy of Kain: Soul Reaver series with Amy Hennig and Seth Carus.

He joined Naughty Dog in June 2004, where he worked on Jak X: Combat Racing, and was the lead designer for the three Uncharted games for PlayStation 3. He left Naughty Dog in 2012 after eight years.

Academics
Since 2012, Lemarchand has been an associate professor in the USC Games program at the University of Southern California.

A Playful Production Process
In October 2021, Lemarchand released A Playful Production Process: For Game Designers (and Everyone), discussing story structure for game designers.

References

Living people

Year of birth missing (living people)
Video game designers
Alumni of the University of Oxford
University of Southern California faculty
MicroProse people
Naughty Dog people
Design writers